Bela Crkva (meaning White Church) is a village in the Municipality of Krivogaštani, Prilep Oblast, North Macedonia. It is situated along the main road between Krivogaštani and Demir Hisar.

Demographics
Presil is attested in the Ottoman defter of 1467/68 as a village in the vilayet of Manastir. The majority of the inhabitants attested bore typical Slavic anthroponyms, with a small minority exhibiting Albanian anthroponyms such as Dika and Leko.

According to the 2002 census, the village had a total of 498 inhabitants. Ethnic groups in the village include:

Macedonians 498

References

Villages in Krivogaštani Municipality